John Douglas Bemo (1824?–1890) was a Seminole Presbyterian and Baptist missionary.  He was the son of a chief and nephew of Osceola. In 1834 he was kidnapped and pressed into service as a sailor for the next eight years.  In 1842 he met the pastor of the Mariner's Church in Philadelphia who arranged for his education and return to the Seminole in 1843.

References

External links
 Encyclopedia of Oklahoma History and Culture - Bemo, John

Further reading
 J. Y. Bryce, ed., "About Some of Our First Schools in Choctaw Nation," The Chronicles of Oklahoma 6 (September 1928). 
 
 Jack M. Schultz, The Seminole Baptist Churches of Oklahoma: Maintaining a Traditional Community (Norman: University of Oklahoma Press, 1999). 
 Michael Welsh, "The Missionary Spirit: Protestantism Among the Oklahoma Seminoles, 1942-1885," The Chronicles of Oklahoma 61 (Spring 1983). 
 Patricia R. Wickman, Osceola's Legacy (Tuscaloosa: University of Alabama Press, 1991). 
 
 
 
 
 

1820s births
1890 deaths
Baptist missionaries from the United States
American Presbyterian missionaries
Presbyterian missionaries in the United States
Baptist missionaries in the United States
19th-century Baptists